= 1946 South West African merger referendum =

- May and June 1946
- We, the undersigned, Chiefs, Headmen or Board Members of the people of the [________] tribe, who live in the [________] Reserve in this mandated Territory of South West Africa, acting with full authority of the people of the tribe of the [________] Reserve, wish to say that we have heard the people of the world are talking about the administration of these countries such as ours and that the administration of these countries may be changed. We and our people wish the following matters to be known to the people of the world: (a) That our people have been happy and have prospered under the rule of the Government of the Union of South Africa and that we should like that Government to continue to rule us; (b) That we do not wish any other Government or people to rule us; (c)That we would like our country to become part of the Union of South Africa.

Results
Choice	Votes	%
Yes	208,850	86.17%
No	33,520	13.83%
Valid votes	242,370	100.00%
Invalid or blank votes	0	0.00%
Total votes	242,370	100.00%
Registered voters/turnout	299,160	81.02%

A referendum on becoming part of South Africa was held in South West Africa in May and June 1946. The referendum took the format of asking tribes whether they wished to remain under South African rule. The number of people in the tribe was assigned to all having voted "yes" or "no" based on the return of a form to the government. However, the United Nations rejected allowing the mandate to join the Union of South Africa, stating that "the African inhabitants of South West Africa have not yet secured political autonomy or reached a stage of political development enabling them to express a considered opinion which the Assembly could recognize on such an important decision as incorporation of their territory."

== Form ==
The tribes were presented with a form with the following text by the government:

"We, the undersigned, Chiefs, Headmen or Board Members of the people of the [________] tribe, who live in the [________] Reserve in this mandated Territory of South West Africa, acting with full authority of the people of the tribe of the [________] Reserve, wish to say that we have heard the people of the world are talking about the administration of these countries such as ours and that the administration of these countries may be changed.

We and our people wish the following matters to be known to the people of the world:
(a) That our people have been happy and have prospered under the rule of the Government of the Union of South Africa and that we should like that Government to continue to rule us;
(b) That we do not wish any other Government or people to rule us;

(c) That we would like our country to become part of the Union of South Africa."

== Results ==
Choice	Votes	%
For	208,850	85.46
Against	33,520	14.54
Total	242,370	100
Eligible voters/turnout	299,160	81.14
Source: Direct Democracy
